Stephen Charles Arthur Lampkin (born 15 October 1964) is an English former professional footballer who played as a midfielder.

Career
Born in Silsden, Lampkin signed for Bradford City in March 1983 from Silsden, leaving the club in 1984 to play for Oswestry Town. During his time with Bradford City he made seven appearances in the Football League, scoring one goal. He also played for Steeton.

He later played with Colne Dynamoes, winning the FA Vase in 1988.

Personal life
Lampkin runs his own engineering company in Silsden.

His cousin Dougie Lampkin is a motorcyclist.

Sources

References

1964 births
Living people
English footballers
Silsden A.F.C. players
Bradford City A.F.C. players
Oswestry Town F.C. players
Colne Dynamoes F.C. players
English Football League players
Association football midfielders
Steeton A.F.C. players